is a dam in the town of Minamiechizen, Fukui Prefecture, Japan.

Masutami Dam is a multipurpose dam aimed at irrigation, flood control on the Hino River, and to provide drinking and industrial water to the cities of Fukui and Sabae. The dam is a rockfill dam with a height 100.4 meters and was built by the Ministry of Agriculture, Forestry and Fisheries. The dam is currently managed by the Fukui prefectural government.

Construction work began in 1981  and was completed in 2005.

References

Dams in Fukui Prefecture
Dams completed in 2005
Minamiechizen, Fukui